Gemmobacter straminiformis is a Gram-negative, facultative anaerobic bacterium from the genus of Gemmobacter which has been isolated from an artificial fountain from the Chonbuk National University in Korea.

References

External links
Type strain of Gemmobacter straminiformis at BacDive -  the Bacterial Diversity Metadatabase

Rhodobacteraceae
Bacteria described in 2017